The 2016–17 Southern Illinois Salukis men's basketball team represented Southern Illinois University Carbondale during the 2016–17 NCAA Division I men's basketball season. The Salukis, led by fifth-year head coach Barry Hinson, played their home games at the SIU Arena in Carbondale, Illinois as members of the Missouri Valley Conference. They finished the season 17–16, 9–9 in MVC play to finish in a tie for third place. In the MVC tournament, they defeated Loyola–Chicago in the quarterfinals before losing to Illinois State in the semifinals.

Previous season
The Salukis finished the 2015–16 season with a record of 22–10, 11–7 in Missouri Valley play to finish in a tie for fourth place. They lost in the quarterfinals of the MVC tournament to Northern Iowa. Despite having 22 wins, they chose not to participate in a postseason tournament.

Offseason

Departures

Incoming transfers

2016 recruiting class

Roster

Schedule and results

|-
!colspan=12 style=| Exhibition

|-
!colspan=12 style=| Non-conference regular season

|-
!colspan=12 style=| Missouri Valley regular season

|-
!colspan=12 style=|  Missouri Valley tournament

References

Southern Illinois Salukis men's basketball seasons
Southern Illinois
2016 in sports in Illinois
2017 in sports in Illinois